Ulverton may refer to:

 Ulverton, Quebec, a municipality of Quebec, Canada
 Ulverton River, a tributary of the Saint-François River, in Le Val-Saint-François Regional County Municipality, Quebec, Canada
 Ulverton (novel), the first novel by British writer Adam Thorpe

See also
 Ulverston, Cumbria, England, formerly in Lancashire
 Ulverstone, Tasmania, Australia